The National Academy of Indian Railways (NAIR), Vadodara formerly Railway Staff College and historically the Pratap Vilas Palace, is a Centralised civil service, engineering and medical training institute for Civil Service, Engineering and Medical Officers of Indian Railway Personnel Service, Indian Railway Stores Service and Indian Railway Medical Services cadre headed by a Director General and staffed by a faculty of experienced Railway Managers and Experts.  Starting with the initial training of Officers Trainees inducted as Central Civil Services, Engineering and Medical professionals that form the backbone of Indian Railways, the Academy also conducts, mid-service mandatory or theme based in service Management Courses for all Officers of IR and courses for Officers of other Group A Central Services, Public Sector and Foreign Railways. The Academy is housed in the sprawling 55 acres campus of the Pratap Vilas Palace at Lalbaug, Vadodara.

History 

The Indian Railway Committee was constituted in 1920, under the chairmanship of Sir William Mitchell Acworth, with 10 members including 3 Indians viz. V. S. Srinivasa Sastri (Elected Member of the Viceroy's Legislative Council), Purshottam Das Thakurdas (representing Indian Commercial Interests) and Sir Rajendra Nath Mookerjee. The committee recommended setting up a Railway Staff College which came up at Dehradun but soon closed down. Later the Indian Military Academy IMA came up on the same campus.

The Railway Staff College was reestablished in 1952 at Pratap Vilas Palace Vadodara built by Maharaja Sayaji Rao for his eldest son Fatehsingh Rao. The Palace is adorned by exquisite carvings. Its construction was started on 15 February 1908 in the year when the last ruler of Baroda State, Pratapsingh Rao was born and his father Fatehsingh Rao died. Named after Pratapsingh Rao, the palace was designed in the renaissance style by Charles F. Stevens, son of F.W. Stevens, the British architect who designed the Victoria Terminus in Mumbai. The palace complex is built in 55 acres (220,000 m2) of well laid out gardens and wooded land enlivened by the calls of peacocks and migratory birds and adorned by exquisite carvings of creepers, flowers, leaves, birds and animals and noted for its architectural grandeur highlighted with columns and arches.  The palace, completed in 1914, also known as Lalbaugh Palace or Prince's Palace, was leased by the then Bombay Government on 31 January 1949 and given to the Railways for their use who subsequently purchased the property on 6 January 1964 for Rs 24,38,271.

Courses 
Indian Railways employs over 1.25 million personnel including 15,000 group ‘A’ and group ‘B’ officers. The Academy is the apex institution for Management Training of all Railway Officers and Centralised & Professional Training for Officers of Accounts, Personnel, Stores and Medical departments including the centralized training of newly recruited IRAS, IRPS, IRSS and IRMS Trainee officers.

Nearly 100 courses for about 3800 officer trainees are planned in 2016. 120 courses were conducted in 2015.

Professional Training of all officers including centralized training of the Officer Trainees of Civil, Electrical, Mechanical, Signal & Telecom Engineering, Traffic Transportation  & Commercial Departments and the Railway Protection Force of Indian Railways is conducted at Seven other Centralised Training Institutes (CTIs)  viz,
 IRICEN-Indian Railways Institute of Civil Engineering, Pune
 IRISET-Indian Railways Institute of Signal and Telecommunications Engineering, Secunderabad
 IRIMEE-Indian Railways Institute of Mechanical and Electrical Engineering, Jamalpur
 IRIEEN-Indian Railways Institute of Electrical Engineering, Nasik
 IRITM-Indian Railways Institute of Transportation Management, Lucknow
 Jagjivan Ram Railway Protection Force Academy Lucknow
 Centralized Training Academy For Railway Accounts Secunderabad.
The training of non-gazetted staff is conducted at 55 Main Training Centers and 222 Other Training Centers (i.e., Area Training Centers, Basic Training Centers, Divisional Training Centers, Multi Disciplinary Training Centers etc.

The Academy

Shri S.P.S Chauhan is the current Director General of the Academy. The faculty comprises 24 experts drawn from various disciplines i.e., Finance, HR, Management, Engineering, Law, Safety, Security, Medicine, Rajbhasha etc.

Faculty of the Academy- See Academy website

The Academy along with all 7 other CTIs function under the administrative control of the Ministry of Railways (Railway Board).

Training programmes

Centralized Training for IRAS, IRSS, IRPS & IRMS

The Academy is the ‘Centralised Training Institute’, for Officer Trainees assigned to ‘Indian Railway Accounts Service’, Indian Railway Personnel Service’, ‘Indian Railway Stores Service’ and Indian Railway Medical Service’ by UPSC. Training includes class room inputs, field training and visits to other CTIs. Officer Trainees of IRAS also attend short term Professional modules at National Academy of Audit and Accounts, Shimla, National Institute of Financial Management, Faridabad, National Academy of Direct Taxes Nagpur and Centralized Training Academy For Railway Accounts (C-TARA) Secunderabad, for discipline specific modules.

Foundation & Induction Programmes for Group A and B Officers

It is a combined programme for Officer Trainees of nine Organized Central Group A Civil & Engineering Services that are responsible for managing Indian Railways and the foundation and induction courses for them. In the case of Officer Trainees of the Indian Railway Medical Service (IRMS), the Organised Central Group A Medical Service, which manages the health services on the Indian Railways network, shorter Foundation and Induction programmes are conducted separately. In order to provide an overview of the railways to recently promoted Group 'B' officers of all departments, the Railways Foundation Programmes are offered. For officers of the Stores, Accounts, and Personnel departments, induction programmes are held as part of their induction process. During the induction courses, Group B officers from other departments attend induction courses held at their respective CTIs.

Mid Service Training
Offered in two formats:

 General inputs of interest to all Managers at various stages in their career.
 Function or subject specific inputs only to relevant set of Managers.

Special Courses

Theme based short term courses on various topics such as Right to Information Act,  Discipline & Appeal Rules, Vigilance, Labour Laws, Railway Safety, Hospital Management, Information Technology are conducted throughout the year.

BIMSTEC Training Program

An International Programme on ‘Costing & Pricing of Rail Transport Services’ is conducted every year for Executives of Railways and other Transport sectors from BIMSTEC & Mekong-Ganga Cooperation and allied countries (Bangladesh, Bhutan, Cambodia, Indonesia, Malaysia, Myanmar, Nepal, Pakistan, Sri Lanka, Thailand, and Vietnam and India).

Seminars/Workshops 
Seminars/Workshops conducted in the past year
Interactive Workshops on Project Management through Alternate Financing, Recruitment procedures for RRB Chairpersons, Good Governance Code for Station Managers
Seminars on Enhancing Productivity on IR through IT Applications, Make in India for the World – Realizing export potential of Railway Products & services, and ‘Startups’

Auditorium 
Seminars, conferences, mock drill sessions, films, cultural functions etc. are organized regularly in the 250 seat auditorium known as ‘Sardar Patel Sabhagriha’.

Library 
The library at has about 53,000 titles on transport, economics, rail transport, psychology, management, law, finance, engineering, computer science, literature and more than 100 journals & government publications are subscribed including 5 e-Journals. The database of the library is available at NIC's (National Informatics Centre) e-Granthalaya portal in a cluster with four other CTIs’ (IRICEN, IRISET, IRIEEN, IRITM and RDSO.  A knowledge portal has been built to aggregate most of the available knowledge on Indian Railways by linking websites, documents etc. 
The website of the Academy nair.indianrailways.gov.in hosts important information like tenders, information for Guest officers, training schedule, 2016- Training Calendar of NAIR.

Model Room 
The Academy has a well equipped model room displaying various types of train operating and signaling systems in use on Indian Railways. Trainee Officers get a feel of practical train operations by running working models of trains under a simulated hands-on environment. Model room has working models of route relay interlocking, auxiliary warning system, automatic block signaling, train activated warning at level crossings, block proving by axle counters, 4 aspects automatic signal & data Logger etc. Souvenirs from the National Rail Museum New Delhi are displayed and are also available for sale to trainees.

Periodicals 
The Academy publishes a newsletter Rail Parisar (Rail Campus) and the bilingual Abhivyakti (Expression) which carries technical and literary articles by Faculty and alumni.

Heritage 
Mild weathering of the limestone facade of the century-old palace as a whole is evident but is severe in some locations. The interior has suffered from heavy use. Conservation efforts are being initiated.  A heritage arcade with an indoor photo gallery has come up in the Palace Guard House at the main entrance. A renovated narrow gauge (2"6') passenger coach is on display next to the guard house.

A heritage walk is being planned for the citizens of Vadodara in the palace grounds in collaboration with the Vadodara Municipal Corporation.

Sports
Sports facilities includes badminton, tennis, squash basketball and volleyball courts, a swimming pool &  sauna, a cricket and football ground,  a gymnasium, a billiards and table tennis lounge, other indoor games and a small golfing green.

Mess
NAIR Officers Mess has one AC dining hall with a capacity of 200 and is managed by a committee of trainee officers and FMs on a "no profit, no loss" basis.

Hostels 
The Academy has three hostels, with a capacity to accommodate about 200 officers in 170 air-conditioned rooms with rooms earmarked on ground floor for differently-abled officers.

Former Director Generals/Principals

References

External links
Official website

Training institutes of Indian Railways
Tourist attractions in Vadodara
Universities and colleges in Vadodara
1888 establishments in India
Educational institutions established in 1888